The trophic level index (TLI) is used in New Zealand as a measure of nutrient status of lakes. It is similar to the trophic state index but was proposed as alternative that suited New Zealand.

The system uses four criteria, phosphorus and nitrogen concentrations, as well as visual clarity and algal biomass weighted equally.

See also
Water pollution in New Zealand
Lakes of New Zealand
Environment of New Zealand

External links
New Zealand Ministry for the Environment - Trophic Level Index for lakes
Definitions of the 5 trophic states - Oligotrophic, Mesotrophic, Eutrophic, Supertrophic and Hypertrophic lakes

References

Water in New Zealand
Water pollution